On Truth is a 2006 book by Harry Frankfurt, a follow-up to his 1986 essay, On Bullshit. It develops the argument that people should care about truth, regardless of intent to be truthful. It explicitly avoids defining "truth" beyond the concept commonly held, which corresponds to reality.

References

Ethics essays
2006 non-fiction books
Truth